The Danbury Branch is a diesel branch of the Metro-North Railroad's New Haven Line in the U.S. state of Connecticut, running from downtown Norwalk north to Danbury. It opened in 1852 as the Danbury and Norwalk Railroad. Until the early 1970s, passenger service continued north from Danbury to Canaan, Connecticut, and Pittsfield, Massachusetts. Metro-North took over operation of the line from Conrail in 1983, and the modern-day branch is mostly single-tracked.

History

The Danbury and Norwalk Railroad began operating its line from Norwalk north to Danbury on February 22, 1852. In July 1872 a branch from the mainline at Bethel northeast to Hawleyville opened. At Hawleyville, the branch connected to the Housatonic Railroad, continuing north into Massachusetts. Also at Hawleyville, connections with the Shepaug Railroad to Litchfield were possible.

Starting on May 1, 1874, that connection was supplemented by the New York, Housatonic and Northern Railroad, running from Danbury northeast to the Housatonic. In 1881 the New York and New England Railroad was completed, giving another connection at Danbury and at Hawleyville. A short branch from Branchville on the mainline west to Ridgefield opened July 1, 1870. In July 1882 an extension was built in Norwalk to docks at Wilson Point. The Housatonic Railroad leased the D&N on July 21, 1887; and soon after, the New York, New Haven and Hartford Railroad leased the Housatonic.

Long-distance passenger service operated on the line. The Berkshire ran on the line from Grand Central to Danbury, to Pittsfield, Massachusetts. Many railroad bridges along the Danbury Branch were damaged or destroyed in the 1955 Norwalk river flood. The NYNH&H merged into Penn Central in 1969. On January 1, 1971, the State of Connecticut leased the Danbury Branch from Penn Central. The last passenger train from Danbury north to Pittsfield, Massachusetts ran in April 1971, the day before Amtrak assumed passenger operations. From 1976 until 1983, freight and passenger service on the line was provided by the Consolidated Rail Corporation (Conrail) under a contract with Connecticut. In 1983 the newly formed Metro-North Commuter Railroad took over operation of passenger service along the line. Conrail continued to provide freight service on the line until 1993. The Providence and Worcester Railroad now provides freight service along the Danbury Branch.

By the time of its closing, fewer than 15 passengers used the station daily.

Electrification
The Danbury Line operated electric-powered trains beginning in 1925. The catenary system on the Danbury Line was removed in 1961 when diesel-powered locomotives resumed service on the line. Steel posts that once carried the overhead catenary system can still be seen along the line. , the Connecticut Department of Transportation was studying the feasibility of installing catenary wire on the Danbury Branch.

Railway museums
The Switchtower Museum in South Norwalk describes to visitors how railroad employees would switch the tracks for trains continuing on the Danbury branch line, then switch them back for trains travelling along the New Haven main line.

The Danbury Railway Museum is located in the former Union Station of the D&N and NY&NE in Danbury. It lies just north of the current Danbury Metro-North station. At the museum are examples of rolling stock retired from service as well as an indoor display of model trains.

Plans

There have been proposals to re-electrify the Danbury Branch, along with a plan to extend service north from Danbury to New Milford.

In connection with the planned redevelopment of the Gilbert & Bennett Wire Mill as a residential neighborhood, reopening a Georgetown station between the Cannondale and Branchville stations has been approved, though not yet scheduled or funded. The previous station was abandoned in the 1970s due to low ridership.

Over $60 million was allocated to the Danbury Branch, approximately half from the economic stimulus package of 2009, to improve current stations, build siding tracks, and install a new signal system. Connecticut Gov. M. Jodi Rell held a press conference with local politicians at the Cannondale station on July 28, 2009, to announce that construction was scheduled to start in late 2009 and finish in 2011. The new signal system finally began operation in 2013, but extensive work was still ongoing in 2014 because of unresolved problems with the drop gates at grade crossings.

In the Fall of 2012, the focus of the plan was only on improving the corridor as far as Danbury, with no extension.

In May 2015, Governor Dannel Malloy's five-year plan for transportation improvements called "Let's Go CT" only mentioned one point for the Danbury Branch. This is a new small rail yard called the Danbury Line Dock Yard Improvements. This area in South Norwalk will include electrification of the southern end of the branch. This was to enable work to commence on the Walk Bridge. However, at the same time a 30-year plan was published that does envision electrification of the Danbury Branch, extending service to New Milford and electrifying that extension. Electrification of the portion to Danbury would cost $400 million; the extension to New Milford would cost $450 million, and the electrification of the extension would cost $540 million.

On February 1, 2017, the Connecticut State Bond Commission authorized $21 million in borrowing for upgrades at the Merritt 7 station as well as for the addition of a station on the New Haven Line. The Merritt 7 station would have a footbridge added, a raised platform, and an expanded shelter.

Plans to reopen the long-closed Wall Street station are under consideration in wake of new housing developments in Norwalk Center.

Stations

All trains stop at all seven stations on the branch. The trip from Danbury to South Norwalk currently (2018) takes about 54 minutes. Limited through service from Danbury to Grand Central takes about 2 hours. Two weekday trains serve the intermediate stations (and ) in peak direction.

The following connecting services are available to Amtrak, Metro-North Railroad, Shore Line East, Norwalk Transit District, and HARTransit.

Rolling stock
Unlike the New Haven main line or the New Canaan Branch, the Danbury Branch is not electrified, and uses diesel locomotives in push-pull operation. Usually, the diesels push trains toward Grand Central Terminal, and pull toward Danbury. All of the passenger cars used are Shoreliner series cars, powered by GE P32AC-DM Genesis or Brookville BL20GH locomotives.

See also
Connecticut Commuter Rail Council

References

External links

Danbury Branch Electrification Feasibility Study (2006–2016)

Metro-North Railroad
New York, New Haven and Hartford Railroad lines
Rail infrastructure in Connecticut
Passenger rail transportation in Connecticut
Danbury, Connecticut
Norwalk, Connecticut
Transportation in Fairfield County, Connecticut
Railway lines opened in 1852